Men

Nations at the 2007 World Aquatics Championships
2007 in Syrian sport
Syria at the World Aquatics Championships